Gavin Hoey (born 5 November 2001) is an Irish cricketer, who bats right-handed and bowls leg breaks. He currently plays for the Leinster Lightning in the Inter-Provincial Trophy and the Pembroke Cricket Club in the Irish Senior Cup. He is the son of Conor Hoey, who is also an Irish former cricketer.

Career 
In May 2018, he was named in the Under-17 winter training squads ahead of the 2018 Irish cricket season. In June 2019, he was selected to play for the Ireland under-19 cricket team in the 2020 Under-19 Cricket World Cup qualifier.

In June 2021, he was added to the Leinster Lightning's squad for the 2021 Inter-Provincial Trophy. When he was named in the squad, Nigel Jones, the head coach of the team, stated that Hoey was an exciting prospect and it was an exciting opportunity for him to play in the tournament. He made his Twenty20 debut for the Leinster Lightning, on 26 June 2021. In the following match, he claimed two wickets against the North West Warriors, and was named the player of the match. Prior to his T20 debut, on 7 June 2021, he made his debut for  Dublin University Cricket Club, hitting one four and two sixes.

He made his List A debut on 10 May 2022, for Leinster Lightning against Munster Reds in the 2022 Inter-Provincial Cup.

References 

2001 births
Living people
Irish cricketers
Leinster Lightning cricketers
Cricketers from Dublin (city)